Quinton Knight (born October 28, 1963) is a former American football lineman who played seven seasons in the Arena Football League with the New York Knights, Denver Dynamite, Orlando Predators, Detroit Drive, Massachusetts Marauders and Miami Hooters. He first enrolled at Pasadena City College before transferring to Sam Houston State University and then California State University, Fullerton. Knight was also a member of the Toronto Argonauts of the Canadian Football League. He was named First Team All-Arena in three consecutive seasons from 1988 to 1990.

References

External links
Just Sports Stats

1963 births
Living people
Sportspeople from Clearwater, Florida
Players of American football from Florida
American football defensive linemen
American football offensive linemen
African-American players of American football
20th-century African-American sportspeople
21st-century African-American people
Cal State Fullerton Titans football players
Denver Dynamite (arena football) players
Detroit Drive players
Massachusetts Marauders players
Miami Hooters players
New York Knights (arena football) players
Orlando Predators players
Pasadena City Lancers football players
Sam Houston Bearkats football players